Tim Nowak (born 13 August 1995 in Bad Mergentheim) is a German athlete competing in the combined events. He represented his country at the 2016 World Indoor Championships finishing seventh.

Competition record

Personal bests
Outdoor
100 metres – 11.04 (+1.3 m/s, Rieti 2013)
200 metres – 22.39 (-0.1 m/s, Neuwied-Engers 2015)
400 metres – 48.90 (Ratingen 2018)
1500 metres – 4:20.66 (Götzis 2019)
110 metres hurdles – 14.46 (+0.2 m/s, Neuwied-Engers 2015)
High jump – 2.04 (Neuwied-Engers 2015)
Pole vault – 5.00 (Ratingen 2018)
Long jump – 7.33 (+1.2 m/s, Knoxville 2018)
Shot put – 14.86 (Götzis 2019)
Discus throw – 47.27 (Götzis 2019)
Javelin throw – 64.22 (Halle 2017)
Decathlon – 8229 (Talence 2018)
Indoor
60 metres – 7.17 (Tallinn 2015)
1000 metres – 2:39.74 (Halle 2019)
60 metres hurdles – 8.21 (Portland 2016)
High jump – 2.09 (Hamburg 2016)
Pole vault – 5.10 (Halle 2019)
Long jump – 7.18 (Hamburg 2016)
Shot put – 14.79 (Halle 2019)
Heptathlon – 5906 (Clermont-Ferrand 2018)

References

1995 births
Living people
German decathletes
People from Bad Mergentheim
Sportspeople from Stuttgart (region)
German male athletes